The Kuveždin monastery is a Serb Orthodox monastery on the Fruška Gora mountain in the northern Serbian province of Vojvodina. Traditionally, its foundation is ascribed to Stefan Štiljanović (late 15th century). The first reliable record of its existence is from a Turkish tax book dated from 1566 to 1569, though the building was constructed much earlier. In 2009, the entire monastery complex has been reconstructed.

The iconostasis of the old church was given away to a church in the village of Opatovac in 1758. The current iconostasis and wall paintings in the new church were carried out by Pavle Simić from 1848 to 1853.

Kuveždin Monastery was declared Monument of Culture of Exceptional Importance in 1990, and it is protected by Republic of Serbia.

See also
Monasteries of Fruška Gora - Fruškać
Monasteries of Fruška Gora
Monument of Culture of Exceptional Importance
Tourism in Serbia
List of Serb Orthodox monasteries

External links
 Kuveždin monastery - Fruškać
More about the monastery

Serbian Orthodox monasteries in Vojvodina
Cultural Monuments of Exceptional Importance (Serbia)
16th-century establishments in Serbia
Christian monasteries established in the 16th century
16th-century Serbian Orthodox church buildings